Tyrone Vontrace Griffin (born September 5, 1967) is an American retired professional baseball second baseman. He played in minor league baseball and in international competition for the United States national baseball team.

Career
Griffin attended C. Leon King High School and the Georgia Institute of Technology, where he played for the Georgia Tech Yellow Jackets baseball team in the Atlantic Coast Conference (ACC). At Georgia Tech, Griffin was named an All-ACC second baseman and the Most Valuable Player of the 1988 Atlantic Coast Conference baseball tournament.

Griffin was part of the United States national baseball team competing in the 1987 Pan American Games and 1988 Summer Olympics.

The Chicago Cubs drafted Griffin in the first round (9th overall) of the 1988 Major League Baseball Draft. He made his professional debut with the Peoria Chiefs of the Class-A Midwest League in 1989, and was promoted to the Charlotte Knights of the Class-AA Southern League that year. Baseball America rated Griffin the 22nd best prospect in baseball prior to the 1990 season. He split the 1990 and 1991 seasons between the Winston-Salem Spirits of the Class-A Advanced Carolina League and Charlotte.

The Cubs traded Griffin to the Cincinnati Reds for Scott Bryant after the 1991 season. The Reds assigned Griffin to their Southern League affiliate, the Chattanooga Lookouts. The Reds released him after the season, and Griffin joined the independent Northern League, where he played for the Thunder Bay Whiskey Jacks in 1993 and the Sioux City Explorers in 1993. He signed with the St. Louis Cardinals and played for the Arkansas Travelers in the Class-AA Texas League in 1995. He returned to independent baseball in 1996 and 1997, playing for the Grand Forks Varmints of the Prairie League.

References

External links

1967 births
Living people
African-American baseball players
Baseball players from Kentucky
C. Leon King High School alumni
Georgia Tech Yellow Jackets baseball players
Baseball players at the 1987 Pan American Games
Baseball players at the 1988 Summer Olympics
Peoria Chiefs players
Winston-Salem Spirits players
Charlotte Knights players
Chattanooga Lookouts players
Thunder Bay Whiskey Jacks players
Sioux City Explorers players
Arkansas Travelers players
Grand Forks Varmints players
Medalists at the 1988 Summer Olympics
Olympic gold medalists for the United States in baseball
Pan American Games medalists in baseball
Pan American Games silver medalists for the United States
Medalists at the 1987 Pan American Games
21st-century African-American people
20th-century African-American sportspeople